This is a list of people who were born in the communities making up the Halifax Regional Municipality, Nova Scotia or spent a significant part of their lives there.

Politicians
Sir Frederick Borden  (1847–1917), Minister of Militia and Defence (Canada) (1896-1911)
Sir Robert Borden  (1854–1937), Prime Minister of Canada (1911-20)
John Buchanan PC, QC (1931–2019), lawyer, 20th Premier of Nova Scotia 1978–1990, member of the Senate of Canada 1990–2006
Walter Fitzgerald (1936-2014), Mayor of Halifax, 1971–1974, 1994–1996
John Godfrey (born 1942), Member of Parliament (1993–2008), President of University of King's College (1977–1987), Financial Post editor (1987–1991) 
Joseph Howe (1804–1873), press freedom advocate and activist, journalist, politician and public servant
Megan Leslie (born 1973), former Member of Parliament and Deputy Leader of the federal New Democratic Party (2012–2015)
Angus L. MacDonald, 12th and 14th Premier of Nova Scotia 1933–1940, 1945–1954 and federal Minister of National Defence for Naval Services, 1940–1945
Alexa McDonough (1944-2022), former Member of Parliament and Leader of the provincial (1980-1994) and federal New Democratic Party (1995-2003)
Gerald Regan, PC, QC (1928–2019), 19th Premier of Nova Scotia 1970–1978, federal cabinet minister 1980–1984
Jo-Ann Roberts (born 1956), interim leader, Green Party of Canada, 2019-2020
Sir John Sparrow David Thompson (1845–1894), Prime Minister of Canada (1892–94)
Sir Charles Tupper (1821–1915), Prime Minister of Canada (1896)
Ronald Wallace (1916–2008), Mayor of Halifax, 1970–1978

Civil rights leaders
 Yvonne Atwell (born 1943), MLA, community leader
 Viola Desmond (1914–1965), Afro-Nova Scotian civil and women's rights activist and businesswoman
 James Robinson Johnston (1876–1915), lawyer and community leader
 Rocky Jones (1941–2013), lawyer, civil rights leader
 William Pearly Oliver  (1912–1989), civil rights leader
 Richard Preston (1791–1861), religious leader, abolitionist

Business leaders
David Bentley (businessman), U.K.-born publisher, editor, founder of The Daily News and Frank magazine
William "Bill" Black, (born 1950) is a Canadian business leader.
Enos Collins (1774–1871), banker
Samuel Cunard (1787–1865), steamship line founder
William Dennis (born 1922), CEO of Halifax Herald, Red Cross Humanitarian award
Michael Donovan (born 1953), former CEO and current chairman of DHX Media; recipient of an Academy Award for Best Documentary
Charles V. Keating, CM (1933–2005), cable czar
Pete Luckett (born 1953), U.K.-born entrepreneur, vinter, specialty grocer, TV personality
Alexander Keith (1795–1893), brewmaster; former mayor of the city of Halifax; first Grand Master Mason for Nova Scotia
Charles Peter McColough (1922–2006), former chairman and CEO of the Xerox Corporation
Sidney Culverwell Oland (1886–1977), Oland brewery owner, philanthropist
Arnie Patterson (1928–2011), radio czar, brewery manager, former press secretary to Pierre Trudeau
John Risley (born c. 1948), founder of Clearwater Fine Foods and Ocean Nutrition Canada
John Fitzwilliam Stairs (1848–1904), entrepreneur and statesman
William Machin Stairs (1789–1865), merchant, banker, and statesman

Military and naval figures

17th–18th centuries 
Charles Lawrence, Father Le Loutre's War
 Father Pierre Maillard, Father Le Loutre's War
Captain Charles Morris, King George's War

19th century 
John Charles Beckwith, Battle of Waterloo
Edward Belcher by Stephen Pearce, Franklin's lost expedition
Lieutenant-Colonel James J. Bremner, North-West Rebellion
 Sir John Eardley Inglis, Indian Mutiny
Clonard Keating, Lieutenant, Nigeria
John Wimburn Laurie, Crimean War
John Houlton Marshall, Battle of Trafalgar, Province House (Nova Scotia)
Captain William B.C.A. Parker, Crimean War
Sir John Coape Sherbrooke, Lieutenant Governor of Nova Scotia, War of 1812 
William Grant Stairs, Captain, the Stairs Expedition to Katanga
Provo Wallis, War of 1812
Major Augustus F. Welsford, Crimean War
George Augustus Westphal, Battle of Trafalgar, Admiralty Garden, Stadacona, CFB Halifax, Nova Scotia
Sir William Williams, 1st Baronet, of Kars by William Gush, Crimean War
John Taylor Wood, American Civil War

20th century 
Philip Bent, Halifax-born recipient of the Victoria Cross
Francis Joseph Fitzgerald, Second Boer War, Fitzgerald Bridge in Halifax Public Gardens
Harold Taylor Wood Grant, commanded HMS Enterprise (D52) in the Battle of the Bay of Biscay
Mona Louise Parsons, World War II
Guy Carleton Jones, 4th Canadian Surgeon General

Diplomats
Audri Mukhopadhyay (born 1974), former Canadian Consul General in Ho Chi Minh City, Vietnam

Scientists
Oswald Avery (1877–1955), physician and medical researcher who proved that DNA is the carrier of genetic information
Walter A. Bell (1889–1969), geologist and paleontologist
Elisabeth Mann Borgese (1918–2002), German-Canadian oceanographer, environmentalist, maritime lawyer, daughter of Thomas Mann
Erik Demaine (born 1981), computer scientist and professor
Danielle Fong (born 1987), co-founder and Chief Scientist of LightSail Energy
Abraham Pineo Gesner (1797–1864), physician and geologist who invented kerosene
Charles Brenton Huggins (1901–1997), Canadian-American physician and researcher, Nobel Prize Winner in Physiology or Medicine "for his discoveries concerning hormonal treatment of prostatic cancer"
E. Elizabeth Patton , FRSE , professor of chemical genetics, Personal Chair in Melanoma Genetics and Drug Discovery, MRC Human Genetics Unit, Edinburgh
Donald O. Hebb (1904–1985), professor of psychology who is best known for contributing Hebbian theory to the field of neuroscience, which he introduced in his classic 1949 work Organization of Behavior

Authors

Novelists or short story authors
Kris Bertin, 2017 Danuta Gleed Award-winning author (Bad Things Happen)
Alexander MacLeod (born 1972), short story writer (Light Lifting) and academic
Donna Morrissey (born 1956), novelist (Kit's Law; What They Wanted)
Sarah Mian, novelist (When the Saints)
Hugh MacLennan, CC, CQ (1907–1990), 5-time Governor General's Award winner (Barometer Rising, Two Solitudes, The Watch That Ends the Night)
Thomas Head Raddall (1903–1994), novelist (Roger Sudden; Halifax, Warden of the North)
Russell Smith (born 1963), novelist (How Insensitive, Muriella Pent), columnist

Playwrights
Catherine Banks, 2-time Governor General's Award-winning playwright (Bone Cage; It Is Solved By Walking)
George Boyd (playwright) (1952–2020) (Shine Boy; Gideon's Blues)
Brendan Gall (born 1978) (Alias Godot; Head-Smashed-In, Buffalo Jump)
Hannah Moscovitch (born 1978) Ottawa-born Governor General's Award-winning playwright (East of Berlin, This is War, Sexual Misconduct of the Middle Classes)
Wendy Lill (born 1950), playwright, M.P.  (Corker, The Fighting Days, The Glace Bay Miners' Museum)
Noah Pink, screenwriter, television producer, director, and swimmer
Alfred Silver, Prairie-born Halifax playwright, novelist (Göttingen, Acadia)

Poets
Bill Bissett (born 1939), poet (Th gossamer bed pan, Th Wind Up Tongue, sublingual)
Lesley Choyce (born 1951), U.S.-born poet (Revenge of the Optimist), novelist, academic, publisher (Pottersfield Portfolio/Press)
George Elliott Clarke  (born 1960), Governor General's Award-winning poet, playwright, novelist, academic (Execution Poems, Illicit Sonnets)
Afua Cooper  (born 1957), Jamaican-Canadian poet and academic (Breaking Chains, Copper Woman, Memories Have Tongue)
Don Domanski (born 1950), Governor General's Award-winner (All of Our Wonder Unavenged, The Cape Breton Book of the Dead, Stations of The Left Hand)
Susan Goyette (born 1964), poet (The True Names of Birds, Lures, The Brief Reincarnation of a Girl)
Amelia Clotilda Jennings (died 1895), poet, novelist (Linden Rhymes, The White Rose in Acadia)
El Jones, poet, academic, activist (Live from the Afrikan Resistance!)
Kenneth Leslie (1892–1974), Governor General's Award-winner (O'Malley to the Reds, By Stubborn Stars), progressive activist and editor (The Protestant Digest)
Annick MacAskill, Governor General's Award-winner (Shadow Blight)
Lorri Neilsen Glenn, poet, essayist, academic (Lost Gospels, Threading Light, Salt Lines, Saved String)

Critics, scholars, other
John Boileau (born 1945), author of historical non-fiction (Half-Hearted Enemies: Nova Scotia, New England and the War of 1812, Valiant Hearts: Atlantic Canada and the Victoria Cross, Halifax and the Royal Canadian Navy, Halifax and Titanic, 6-12-17: The Halifax Explosion)
George Grant (philosopher) (1918–1988), philosopher, academic (Lament for a Nation, Technology and Empire)
Stephen Kimber (born 1949), journalist, editor, broadcaster, professor (Sailors, Slackers and Blind Pigs: Halifax at War)
Steven Laffoley (born 1965), creative non-fiction and crime writer (Halifax Nocturne)
Thomas McCulloch (1776–1843), Scottish-born clergyman, naturalist, humourist, author (The Stepsure Letters)
Malcolm Ross (literary critic)  (1911–2002), critic (Poetry & Dogma), editor (McClelland and Stewart's New Canadian Library), professor, NFB film executive

Actors, directors, comedians

Actors
Walter Borden (born 1942), Shakespearian stage, TV and film actor (King Lear, Tightrope Time)
Henry Beckman (1921–2008), stage, film, and television actor (McHale's Navy, Why Rock the Boat?)
Chuck Campbell (born 1969), actor (Stargate Atlantis)
Josephine Crowell (1859-1932), actor (Birth of a Nation, Hot Water)
Peter Flemming (born 1967), actor (Stargate Atlantis)
Eli Goree, actor, (The 100, Ballers)
Harry Hayden (1882-1955), actor (Two Against the World), (Hail the Conquering Hero)
Tamara Hickey, actress (The Associates, Blue Murder)
Leslie Hope (born 1965), actress (Talk Radio; Paris, France; 24)
Michael Jackson (born 1970), actor (Trailer Park Boys), musician (a.k.a. Doug Mason)
Ruby Keeler (1909–1993), actress, dancer (42nd Street,  Gold Diggers of 1933, Footlight Parade, Dames)
Steve Lund (born 1989), actor
David Manners (1900–1998), actor (Kismet, Browning's Dracula, Freund's The Mummy, The Moonstone)
Forbes March (born 1973), actor born in UK but raised in Halifax (All My Children, As the World Turns, One Life to Live)
Peter North (born 1957), adult film actor, director, producer (North Poles)
Sonja O'Hara (born 1987), actress, director (Root Letter)
Craig Olejnik (born 1979), actor, (Margaret's Museum, The Listener)
Ty Olsson (born 1974), actor (Kingdom Hospital)
Elliot Page (born 1987), Academy Award-nominated actor (Juno, Inception, To Rome with Love, Into the Forest)
John Reardon (born 1975), actor and former university football player (Hudson & Rex)
Laura Regan (born 1977), actress (Mad Men)
Joanna Shimkus (born 1943), actress (Boom!, The Virgin and the Gypsy, A Time for Loving)
Cindy Sampson (born 1978), actress (Private Eyes)
Anthony Sherwood (born 1949), actor, producer, director, writer, and R&B singer (Street Legal)
Chase Tang (born 1988), actor Jupiter's Legacy, Slasher
Jonathan Torrens (born 1972), actor (Trailer Park Boys, Mr. D), television personality (TV with TV's Jonathan Torrens)
John Paul Tremblay (born 1968), actor and writer (Trailer Park Boys)
Robb Wells (born 1971), actor and writer (Trailer Park Boys, Hobo With a Shotgun)
Austin Willis, actor, TV host.

[Note: UK actor John Neville (1925–2011) and US actors Michael Moriarty (born 1941) and Jan Smithers (born 1949) are all former extended-term residents of Halifax.]

Directors/screenwriters
Rob Boutilier (born 1971), cartoonist, born in Halifax
Cory Bowles (born 1973), actor (Trailer Park Boys), writer, director (Black Cop)
Mike Clattenburg (born 1968), TV and film director, creator of the Trailer Park Boys
Paul Donovan, TV and film writer/director, creator of 'LEXX'
Barrie Dunn (born 1952), actor (Trailer Park Boys), writer (Canada Russia '72), director, producer, lawyer
Thom Fitzgerald (born 1968), director, writer (The Hanging Garden, Cloudburst, 3 Needles, Wild Dogs)
 Floyd Kane, lawyer, creator of Diggstown
Karen Walton, screenwriter (Ginger Snaps, Orphan Black)

Comedians
Jackie Cox, Drag Queen (RuPaul’s Drag Race)
Mark Farrell (born 1968), comedian, writer, producer, actor (The Newsroom)
Ron James, Glace Bay-raised Halifax-based comedian, actor
Nikki Payne (born 1976), comedian 
Picnicface, comedy troupe
The Unknown Comic, real name Murray Langston (born 1945), actor, comedian
Cheryl Wagner, clown and puppeteer
Jennifer Whalen, Toronto-raised Halifax-resident writer, actor (Baroness von Sketch Show, This Hour Has 22 Minutes)

Broadcasters
Steve Armitage (born 1944), sportscaster
Frank Cameron (born 1938), CBC anchorman, deejay, columnist, Music Hop host (Frank's Bandstand)
Peter Coade (born 1942), broadcast meteorologist
Robert MacNeil (born 1931), former PBS anchorman (The MacNeil-Lehrer Report)
Bruce Rainnie, sportscaster, anchorman
Perry F. Rockwood (1917–2008), radio evangelist
Tara Slone (born 1973), host Rogers Hometown Hockey, singer, actress

Visual artists and sculptors
Bob Chambers, (1905–1996), political cartoonist
Joey Comeau (born 1980), author and co-creator of the webcomic A Softer World
Gerald Ferguson, artist
Hal Foster (1892–1982), comic book artist
Alice Mary Hagen (1872 – 1972), Canadian ceramic artist
Sarah Jeanette Jackson, artist
Garry Neill Kennedy, artist, NSCAD University president 1967–1996, recipient of the Order of Canada award
George Lang (builder) (1821–1881), sculptor, stonemason (Sebastopol Monument, Art Gallery of Nova Scotia, Halifax Provincial Court (Spring Garden Road))  
Ernest Lawson (1873–1939), artist
Owen McCarron (1929–2005), cartoonist
George Steeves (born 1945), contemporary photographer
Marguerite Porter Zwicker (1904–1993), painter and art promoter
Bruce MacKinnon political cartoonist and musician

Musicians

Classical
Denise Djokic (born 1980), cellist
Barbara Fris (born 1956), operatic soprano
Barbara Hannigan (born 1971), operatic soprano
Don Ross (guitarist) (born 1960), fingerstyle classical, jazz and folk guitarist
Georg Tintner (1917–1999) Austrian-born conductor; resident of Halifax from 1987 until his death
Portia White (1911–1968), operatic contralto

Country
Brian Ahern, music producer
Ridley Bent (born 1979), country singer songwriter
The Guthries (country-rock band), active from 1998–2002
Eddy (M) Melanson, 1950s rockabilly singer
Hank Snow (1914–1999), country music artist born in Brooklyn, Queens County, Nova Scotia; career started in Halifax
Gordon Stobbe (born 1946), fiddler, TV host
Jason Price, country singer/songwriter (current)

Folk
Ben Caplan, folk musician
Melanie Doane (born 1967), singer-songwriter
Rose Cousins (born 1977), singer-songwriter 
Denny Doherty (1940–2007), singer-songwriter, a founding member of The Mamas & the Papas
Luke Doucet (born 1973), singer-songwriter
Jenn Grant (born 1980), singer-songwriter
Dylan Guthro (born 1991), singer-songwriter from Cape Breton, now based in Halifax
The Halifax Three, 1960s folk group
Rebekah Higgs (born 1982), singer-songwriter
Mo Kenney (born 1990), singer-songwriter
Daniel Ledwell, record producer and multi-instrumentalist
Ryan MacGrath, singer-songwriter
Ed McCurdy (1919–2000), American singer-songwriter, peace activist lived in Halifax from 1984-2000
Ruth Minnikin, singer-songwriter
Old Man Luedecke, Juno winning singer-songwriter
Denis Ryan, Irish-Canadian singer and tin whistler, based in Halifax since 1980 
The Stanfields, folk rock band
Al Tuck (born 1966), singer-songwriter from Prince Edward Island, based in Halifax since 1980s

Jazz, blues, and soul
Bucky Adams (1937-2012), jazz and blues saxophonist
Jill Barber (born 1980), Halifax-based singer-songwriter
Gary Beals (born 1982), singer
Holly Cole (born 1963), singer, actor
Gypsophilia (formed 2004), jazz band
JRDN (Ralph Jordon Croucher), R&B recording artist
Dutch Mason (1938–2006), blues hollerer, singer, jazz musician and Order of Canada inductee ("Prime Minister of the Blues")
David Myles (born 1981), musician originally from Fredericton, now lives and records in Halifax
Joe Sealy (born 1939), pianist, composer (Africville Suite)
Nelson Symonds (1933–2008), jazz guitarist
Jody Upshaw (born 2003), R&B/pop artist

Hip hop and rap
Buck 65 (born 1972), rapper, hip hop artist, MC, CBC personality Rich Terfry
Classified, real name Luke Boyd, rapper
Tanya Davis, spoken word poet and singer
Hip Club Groove, 1990s hip hop band
Sixtoo, 1990s hip hop artist
Skratch Bastid (born 1982), Bedford-raised deejay, producer, 3-time Scribble Jam DJ Battle winner
Wordburglar, alternative hip hop artist

Rock and pop

Individuals
Rich Aucoin, indie-rock musician
Adam Baldwin (singer), singer/songwriter
Rob Benvie, guitarist, singer/songwriter
Jon Bryant, singer and songwriter
Brendan Croskerry (born 1985), singer, songwriter, multi-instrumentalist
Myles Goodwyn (born 1948), singer, songwriter, producer, April Wine and solo
Ryan Hemsworth, DJ and producer
Ria Mae, singer and songwriter
Matt Mays (born 1979), singer, songwriter (solo and with El Torpedo)
Sarah McLachlan (born 1968), singer, songwriter, pianist
Kevin MacMichael (1951–2002), Cutting Crew guitarist
Matt Murphy, singer/songwriter guitarist, actor (The Life and Hard Times of Guy Terrifico)
Dale Murray, musician, guitarist and vocalist for Cuff the Duke
Joel Plaskett (born 1974), singer, songwriter

Bands
Alert the Medic (formed 2006), rock band 
April Wine (band), formed in 1969
Dog Day (formed 2004), indie-rock duo
The Flashing Lights, indie rock band 1990s–2000s
The Hylozoists (formed 2001), instrumental rock group
In-Flight Safety (formed in 2003), indie-rock band originally from Sackville
Jale (band), formed in 1992
Jellyfishbabies, indie rock band, 1986-1993
Mir, alternative band, 1998–2010
Neon Dreams (band), Alt-Pop Duo (formed 2013)
North of America (1997–2003), indie-rock band
Port Cities (band formed in 2015)
Sloan (band), formed in 1991
The Stolen Minks (formed in 2003), garage-punk band
The Super Friendz, indie rock band, 1994–1997, 2003–2004
Thrush Hermit, 90s alternative rock band
Tuns (band), indie supergroup featuring Sloan and Super Friendz members
TWRP (band), 80s electro synthesizer rock band, formed in 2007
Wintersleep (band), formed in 2001

Sportspeople

Baseball 
Shorty Dee (1889–1971), MLB shortstop, St. Louis Browns
John Doyle (baseball) (1858–1915), MLB pitcher, St. Louis Brown Stockings 
Pat Hannivan (1866–1908), MLB outfielder/infielder, Brooklyn Bridegrooms
Vince Horsman (born 1967), MLB pitcher, Oakland A's, Toronto Blue Jays
Rick Lisi (born 1956), MLB outfielder, Texas Rangers
Pat Scanlon (outfielder) (1861–1913), MLB outfielder, Boston Reds

Basketball 
Lindell Wigginton (born 1998), basketball player, Milwaukee Bucks, Wisconsin Herd
Nate Darling (born 1998), basketball player for the Charlotte Hornets, Ontario Clippers

Boxing 
Ricky Anderson, 1981 North American light-welterweight champion
Trevor Berbick (1954–2006), WBC World Heavyweight Champion (1986)
Chris Clarke (born 1956), 1975 Pan Am Games lightweight gold-medalist 
Buddy Daye (1928–1995), Canadian featherweight champion 1964-66, community activist
David Downey (born 1942), Canadian middleweight champion 1967–77
Ray Downey (born 1968), Olympic medalist, light-heavyweight
George Dixon (1870–1908), first black world boxing champion in any weight class; first ever Canadian-born boxing champion
Clyde Gray (born 1947), Commonwealth Champion, WBA welterweight contender
Kirk Johnson (born 1972), heavyweight boxer, Olympian

Football 
Eddie Murray, (born 1956) former NFL Kicker
Tyrone Williams (born 1970), retired NFL and CFL player
Steve Morley (born 1981), retired NFL and CFL player
Larry Uteck (1952–2002), CFL player (1974–80), CIAU coach (1983–97) [Coach of the Year (1988, 1992)], athletic director, Alderman, Deputy Mayor

Hockey 
Justin Barron (born 2001), ice hockey player for the Montreal Canadiens
Eric Boulton (born 1976), former NHL hockey player (2000–15) 
Rick Bowness (born 1955), head coach of various NHL teams (1988-2004), Dallas Stars (2019-2022), Winnipeg Jets (2022-present)
Mike Backman (born 1955), former NHL and CHL player (1976–86)
Sidney Crosby (born 1987), 3-time Stanley Cup champion, Olympic gold medalist, Conn Smythe (2) Art Ross (2) Hart (2) trophies winner
Ryan Flinn (born 1980), former NHL enforcer (2001-06)
Andrew Gordon (born 1985), AHL, NHL (2008–13), and SHL (Swedish Hockey League) player
Hilliard Graves (born 1950), former NHL and WHA player (1970–80)
Matthew Highmore (born 1996), NHL player for the St. Louis Blues
Bert Hirschfeld (1929–1996), former NHL player (1949–51)
Jack Ingram (1893–1957), former professional hockey player (NHL, 1924–25)
Don Johnson (1930–2012), president of the Canadian Amateur Hockey Association and civil servant 
Mike Johnston (ice hockey) (born 1957), head coach and GM, Portland Winterhawks; former Pittsburgh Penguins head coach (2014–2016)
Andrew Joudrey (born 1984), NHL (2004) and DEL Deutsche Eishockey Liga hockey player
Don Koharski (born 1955), former NHL referee
Alex Killorn (born 1989), Tampa Bay Lightning forward, 2012 Calder Cup winner (Norfolk Admirals), 2-time Stanley Cup champion
Olaf Kolzig (born 1970), former NHL goalie (1989-2009), played minor NSAHA/NSMMHL hockey in Dartmouth (1985–87)
David Ling (born 1975), former NHL player (1996-2004)
Nathan MacKinnon (born 1995), Stanley Cup champion, first overall pick in 2013 NHL Entry Draft 2012 QMJHL rookie of year and Halifax Mooseheads
Ian MacNeil, former NHL player (2002–03)
Brad Marchand (born 1988), Stanley Cup Champion, former member of the Halifax Mooseheads
Peter Marsh (born 1956), retired NHL player
Wayne Maxner (born 1942), former NHL player (1964-66), NHL coach Detroit Red Wings (1980–82) 
Liam O'Brien, hockey player, Arizona Coyotes
Pokey Reddick (born 1964), former NHL goalie (1986-94)
Cam Russell (born 1969), former NHL player (1989-99)
James Sheppard (born 1988), former NHL player (2007-15) and DEL Deutsche Eishockey Liga hockey player 
Wendell Young (born 1963), former NHL (1985–95) and IHL/CHL goalie (1981-2001)
Shane Bowers (ice hockey) (born 1999), AHL player (2019-present), one NHL game in 2022 before returning to the AHL, and played in the NSMMHL.

Martial arts 
T. J. Grant (born 1984), mixed martial artist, UFC Lightweight contender
Roger Hollett, mixed martial artist, former UFC Light Heavyweight
Chris Kelades, mixed martial artist, former UFC Flyweight
John Makdessi, mixed martial artist, UFC Lightweight competitor

Other 
Janet Gladys Aitken (1908–1988), equestrian and former director of the All England Jumping Course at Hickstead
Jackie Barrett (born 1974), Special Olympics Powerlifter, amassed 15 Powerlifting medals at four Special Olympics World Games appearances
Ellie Black (born 1995), Olympic gymnast
Jamie Bone (born 1966), 3-time gold medallist, 1988 Summer Paralympics (100m, 200m, 400m)
Jillian D'Alessio (born 1985), sprint kayaker, two-time Pan-American gold medalist
Nancy Garapick (born 1961), backstroke swimmer, Olympic medalist and former Olympic record holder, former world record holder
Stephen Giles (born 1972), sprint canoeist, World Champion (1998), Olympic bronze-medallist (2000)
Stephen Hart (footballer), (born 1960), former soccer player, national team manager (Canada, 2006–07, 2009–12; Trinidad and Tobago, 2013–16), manager of the Halifax Wanderers (CPL) (2018-22).
Colleen Jones (born 1959), World Champion curler, CBC personality
Mark de Jonge (born 1984), sprint canoeist, olympic bronze medalist, two World Championship golds and one Pan-American gold
Ian Millar (born 1947), show jumper, World Champ (3), 10-time Olympian (1972-2012), Olympic silver medallist (2008), Pan Am Champ (1987, 1999, 2015)
Morgan Williams, professional rugby player, born in Kingston, Ontario, raised in Cole Harbour

Criminals
Alexander Keith, Jr. (1827–1875), American Civil War secret agent, saboteur, terrorist, mass killer
John Tillmann (1961–2018), art thief, fraudster

Other
 John Henry Barnstead registrar and coroner in charge of the Titanic disaster - creator of the Barnstead Method
 Eddie Carvery, Africville political protestor
 Helen Creighton CM (1899–1989), folklorist
 Patrick Vincent (Vince) Coleman, Halifax Explosion hero
 Adèle Hugo, French national, subject of The Story of Adèle H., Halifax resident 1863-1866, (daughter of Victor Hugo).
 Chögyam Trungpa, Buddhist teacher

References

 
Halifax
Halifax Regional Municipality
People